Farmersville is an unincorporated community in Livingston County, in the U.S. state of Missouri.

History
Farmersville was laid out in 1870, and named for its location in an agricultural region. A post office called Farmersville was established in 1867, and remained in operation until 1901.

References

Unincorporated communities in Livingston County, Missouri
Unincorporated communities in Missouri